Crestmore Heights is a former census-designated place in Riverside County, California, now part of the city of Jurupa Valley, California. The 2010 United States census reported Crestmore Heights's population was 384.

Geography
The community is located on the south side of Fontana, north of downtown Riverside, California, and west of the Santa Ana River.

According to the United States Census Bureau, the CDP covers an area of 0.3 square miles (0.7 km2), all of it land.

Crestmore Quarry
The former and large Crestmore Quarry is on the east side of the hill. The Riverside Portland Cement Company had its plant here, and used both the limestone and the underlying granodiorite for its manufacture of cement.  Mineral specimens were also collected from the mine.

As of March 2015, the mining operation of the former TXI cement manufacturing facility has stopped. As the shut down of the operations of this historic facility progressed, the quality of the environment appeared to have increased.

Demographics
The 2010 United States Census reported that Crestmore Heights had a population of 384. The racial makeup of Crestmore Heights was 229 (59.6%) White (28.9% Non-Hispanic White), 2 (0.5%) African American, 2 (0.5%) Native American, 6 (1.6%) Asian, 0 (0%) Pacific Islander, 133 (35%) from other races, and 12 (3.1%) from two or more races. Hispanic or Latino of any race were 263 persons (68.5%).

The Census reported that 384 people (100% of the population) lived in households, 0 (0%) lived in non-institutionalized group quarters, and 0 (0%) were institutionalized.

There were 112 households, out of which 41 (37%) had children under the age of 18 living in them, 54 (48%) were opposite-sex married couples living together, 14 (13%) had a female householder with no husband present, 11 (10%) had a male householder with no wife present.  There were 9 (8%) unmarried opposite-sex partnerships, and 3 (3%) same-sex married couples or partnerships. 21 households (19%) were made up of individuals, and 8 (7%) had someone living alone who was 65 years of age or older. The average household size was 3.43.  There were 79 families (71% of all households); the average family size was 4.03.

The population was spread out, with 99 people (26%) under the age of 18, 62 people (16%) aged 18 to 24, 77 people (20%) aged 25 to 44, 109 people (28%) aged 45 to 64, and 37 people (10%) who were 65 years of age or older.  The median age was 33.7 years. For every 100 females, there were 107.6 males.  For every 100 females age 18 and over, there were 108.0 males.

The homeowner vacancy rate was 2%; the rental vacancy rate was 11%.  276 people (72% of the population) lived in owner-occupied housing units and 108 people (28%) lived in rental housing units.

Government

California is represented in the United States Senate by Democrats Dianne Feinstein and Kamala Harris.

References

 
Census-designated places in Riverside County, California
Census-designated places in California